The 22801 / 02 Visakhapatnam–Chennai Central Express is a Express express train belonging to East Coast Railway zone and 22869/70 Visakhapatnam–Chennai Central Superfast Express train belonging to South Coast Railway zone of Indian Railways that runs between  and  in India.

It operates as train number 22801 from Visakhapatnam to Chennai Centralvia New Guntur and as train number 22802 in the reverse direction. Similarly train number 22869 from Visakhapatnam to Chennai Central  are serving the states of Andhra Pradesh & Tamil Nadu.

Coaches
The 22801 / 02 Visakhapatnam–Chennai Central Express has one AC 2-tier, three AC 3-tier, 7 sleeper class, six general unreserved & two SLR (seating with luggage rake) coaches. It does not carry a pantry car.

Similarly the 22869 / 70 Visakhapatnam–Chennai Central SF Express has one AC 2-tier, four AC 3-tier, 8 sleeper class, six general unreserved & two SLR (seating with luggage rake) coaches. It does not carry a pantry car.

Service

Route 
This train is maintained by East Coast Railway zone.

This train is maintained by South Coast Railway zone.

Traction
As the route is electrified, an Electric Loco Shed, Visakhapatnam|Visakhapatnam]] or Vijayawada-based WAP-4 locomotive pulls the train to its destination.

References

External links
22801 Visakhapatnam-Chennai Central Express at India Rail Info
22802 Visakhapatnam-Chennai Central Express at India Rail Info

Express trains in India
Transport in Visakhapatnam
Rail transport in Tamil Nadu
Rail transport in Andhra Pradesh
Transport in Chennai